Gustaf Wretman (10 August 1888 – 17 October 1949) was a Swedish backstroke and freestyle swimmer. He competed at the 1906 Intercalated Games and the 1908 Summer Olympics.

References

External links
 

1888 births
1949 deaths
Swedish male backstroke swimmers
Swedish male freestyle swimmers
Olympic swimmers of Sweden
Swimmers at the 1906 Intercalated Games
Swimmers at the 1908 Summer Olympics
Swimmers from Stockholm
20th-century Swedish people